Trifolium eriocephalum is a species of clover known by the common name woollyhead clover or hairy head clover.

Distribution
The plant is native to the north-western United States, and to California, Nevada, and Utah.

It is a common plant of several types of habitat, including Coast redwood forest, coastal prairie, mixed evergreen forest, and yellow pine forest.

Description
Trifolium eriocephalum is a hairy perennial herb producing an upright, unbranched stem. The leaves are made up of oval leaflets up to 4 centimeters long.

The inflorescence is a head of flowers up to 3 centimeters long with flowers spreading and soon drooping. The flower has a densely hairy, tubular calyx of sepals with long, narrow linear lobes that may bend outward. The white or yellowish corolla may be up to 1.4 centimeters long.

Subspecies
Trifolium eriocephalum ssp. cusickii —  Cusick's clover, Great Basin region.
Trifolium eriocephalum ssp. eriocephalum

References

External links
Calflora Database: Trifolium eriocephalum (Woollyhead clover)
USDA Plants Profile for Trifolium eriocephalum (woollyhead clover)
Jepson Manual eFlora (TJM2) treatment of Trifolium eriocephalum var. eriocephalum
Washington Burke Museum
UC CalPhotos gallery: Trifolium eriocephalum

eriocephalum
Flora of the Northwestern United States
Flora of California
Flora of Nevada
Flora of Utah
Flora of the Klamath Mountains
Flora without expected TNC conservation status